Men's 100m races for wheelchair athletes at the 2004 Summer Paralympics were held in the Athens Olympic Stadium. Events were held in three disability classes.

T52

The T52 event consisted of a single race. It was won by Salvador Hernández, representing .

Final Round
24 Sept. 2004, 19:25

T53

The T53 event consisted of 3 heats and a final. It was won by Hong Suk Man, representing .

1st Round

Heat 1
24 Sept. 2004, 10:10

Heat 2
24 Sept. 2004, 10:16

Heat 3
24 Sept. 2004, 10:22

Final Round
25 Sept. 2004, 21:10

T54

The T54 event consisted of 4 heats, 2 semifinals and a final. It was won by Leo Pekka Tahti, representing .

1st Round

Heat 1
25 Sept. 2004, 10:55

Heat 2
25 Sept. 2004, 11:01

Heat 3
25 Sept. 2004, 11:07

Heat 4
25 Sept. 2004, 11:13

Semifinals
Heat 1
25 Sept. 2004, 17:00

Heat 2
25 Sept. 2004, 17:06

Final Round
26 Sept. 2004, 20:50

References

M